The 2015–16 Turkish Airlines Euroleague was the 16th season of the modern era of Euroleague Basketball and the sixth under the title sponsorship of the Turkish Airlines. Including the competition's previous incarnation as the FIBA Europe Champions Cup, this was the 59th season of the premier competition for European men's professional basketball clubs.

The 2016 Euroleague Final was played between CSKA Moscow and Fenerbahçe at the Mercedes-Benz Arena in Berlin, Germany. CSKA Moscow defeated Fenerbahçe 101–96 on extra time in the final to win their seventh European Cup/Euroleague title. Real Madrid were the title holders, but they were eliminated by Fenerbahçe in the playoffs.

Team allocation
A total of 24 teams participated in the 2015–16 Euroleague.

Distribution
The table below shows the default access list.

Teams

The labels in the parentheses show how each team qualified for the place of its starting round (TH: Euroleague title holders):
A: Qualified through an A–licence, based on the Euroleague club ranking and other regulations.
1st, 2nd, etc.: League position after Playoffs
WC: Wild card

Notes

Round and draw dates
The schedule of the competition is as follows.

Draw
The draw was held on 9 July 2015, 13:00 CEST, at the Mediapro Auditorium in Barcelona. The 24 teams were drawn into four groups of six, with the restriction that teams from the same country could not be drawn against each other. For this purpose, Adriatic League worked as only one country. For the draw, the teams were seeded into six pots, in accordance with the Club Ranking, based on their performance in European competitions during a three-year period and the lowest possible position that any club from that league can occupy in the draw is calculated by adding the results of the worst performing team from each league.

Notes

 Indicates teams with points applying the minimum for the league they play.

Regular season

Group A

Group B

Group C

Group D

Top 16

Group E

Group F

Playoffs

Series

Final Four

The four winners of the quarterfinals qualified for the Final Four. The semifinals were played on May 13, while the third place game and championship game were played on May 15, 2016. The event was held at the Mercedes-Benz Arena in Berlin, Germany.

Attendances

Average home attendances

Top 10

Individual statistics

Rating

Points

Rebounds

Assists

Other statistics

Game highs

Awards

Euroleague MVP 
 Nando de Colo ( CSKA Moscow)

Euroleague Final Four MVP 
 Nando de Colo ( CSKA Moscow)

All-Euroleague Teams

Top Scorer (Alphonso Ford Trophy)
  Nando de Colo ( CSKA Moscow)

Best Defender
  Kyle Hines ( CSKA Moscow)

Rising Star
  Álex Abrines ( FC Barcelona Lassa)

MVP of the Week

Regular season

Top 16

Playoffs

MVP of the Month

See also
2015–16 Eurocup Basketball
2015–16 FIBA Europe Cup

References

External links
Official website

 
EuroLeague seasons